The Mondrian Hotel is a boutique hotel owned and/or operated by SBE Entertainment Group, located in West Hollywood, California.

History
The structure was built in 1959 as an apartment building. It was later renovated and reopened in 1985 as the Le Mondrian by the L'Ermitage Hotel Group. The outside of Le Mondrian featured a commissioned work by Yaacov Agam entitled L'Hommage a Mondrian which covered the hotel's 9 story exterior. As of November 2014 room rates begin at $365 per night.

Le Mondrian was later purchased by Ian Schrager and his Morgans Hotel Group in 1996 and renamed Mondrian Hotel Los Angeles. In 2008, Morgans Hotel Group commissioned designer Benjamin Noriega-Ortiz to update the hotel.

In April 2011, Morgans Hotel Group reached a deal to sell the Mondrian Los Angeles to Pebblebrook Hotel Trust for $137 million.  Morgans Hotel Group will continue to manage the hotel under a 20-year agreement.

On November 30, 2016, Morgans Hotel Group, including the Mondrian Los Angeles, was acquired by SBE Entertainment Group for $805 million.

In popular culture

Events
On December 4, 2007, rapper Pimp C was found dead in his room at the Mondrian Hotel in West Hollywood, California.

The wrap party of Star Trek: Deep Space Nine was held at the Mondrian in 1999. Images of the party at the Mondrian can be seen in the season seven DVD of the series.

Films
Britney Spears documentary Britney: For the Record (2008), was filmed at the Mondrian Hotel.

Literature
One of the main characters in William Gibson's novel Spook Country (2007) stays at the Mondrian while in Los Angeles on business.

Music
The hotel is featured in the video for "All Up 2 You" (2009), performed by Akon, Aventura, and Wisin & Yandel

The lyrics to Dr. Dooom and Jacky Jasper's song "Neighbours Next Door", from First Come, First Served (1999), state: "Lookin' out your Mondrian Hotel window, like Elvis Presley coming down the elevator."

The lyrics to 50 Cent's song "Places to Go", from 8 Mile: Music from and Inspired by the Motion Picture (2002), reference the hotel: "Matter of fact you gotta send it to Sunset Blvd up in the Mondrian"

Television
Several episodes of the HBO series Entourage were filmed on-location at the Mondrian.

In the third installment of the Family Guy Star Wars parody, "Episode VI It's a trap", about 16:11 into the episode, the character played by Angela thanks her audience for meeting her "in the lobby of the Mondrian", drawing a comparison between the Mondrian Miami lobby's futuristic design and the interior of a Star Wars spaceship.

See also
 SkyBar

References

External links
 

Hotel chains in the United States
Accor hotels
1996 establishments in California
Residential buildings completed in 1959